Bumi Hills is the name of a group of hills and a luxury safari lodge in Mashonaland West province Zimbabwe. Bumi Hills Safari Lodge is situated on the hilly ground overlooking the southern shore of Lake Kariba. The area is noted for its fantastic wildlife and magnificent views, especially the view out across Lake Kariba from the main Bumi Hills ridge.

Access is by air in bush planes landing at the airstrip which is a short 15min game drive from the lodge.

Accommodation
Bumi Hills Safari Lodge (reopened by African Bush Camps in January 2018 after a $3M renovation) 
The lodge features 10 lake view rooms and a private villa.
The main area is well known for the infinity pool overlooking the lake.
Activities available include game drives, fishing, sunset cruises on the lake and visits to the local community to see the African Bush Camps Foundation projects.

External links
 

Geography of Mashonaland West Province
Landforms of Zimbabwe
Tourist attractions in Mashonaland West Province
Hills of Africa